Night Nurse is a comic-book series published by Marvel Comics in the early 1970s. Linda Carter, one of the series' three central characters, previously was the lead of an earlier Marvel series, Linda Carter, Student Nurse, published in 1961. Other central characters included Georgia Jenkins and Christine Palmer; both Linda Carter and Christine Palmer would later be explicitly incorporated into the larger 616 Marvel Universe comics.

Carter later adopted the name Night Nurse for herself, and in this incarnation, first appeared in Daredevil #58 (May 2004), as a medical professional specializing in helping injured superheroes.

Dr. Strange: The Oath, by writer Brian K. Vaughan and artist  Marcos Martín, is a 2007 five part limited series that co-starred Linda Carter as Night Nurse alongside  Dr. Strange. 

Christine Palmer appears in the Marvel Cinematic Universe films Doctor Strange (2016) and Doctor Strange in the Multiverse of Madness (2022), portrayed by Rachel McAdams. Additionally, McAdams voiced an alternate timeline version in the Disney+ animated series What If...? (2021). 

Linda Carter and her later Night Nurse role as a medical professional for superheroes were also amalgamated into the character Claire Temple (portrayed by Rosario Dawson), who appeared in the Marvel television series as a combination of Linda Carter (the “Night Nurse”) and the comic character Claire Temple.

Publication history
Night Nurse was a Marvel Comics title that lasted four issues (cover-dated Nov. 1972–May 1973). The medical drama/romance series focused on the adventures of three female roommates who worked the night shift at the fictional Metropolitan General Hospital in New York City: Linda Carter, Georgia Jenkins, and Christine Palmer.

Night Nurse was one of a trio of Marvel Comics of the time that were aimed at a female audience, alongside The Claws of the Cat and Shanna the She-Devil. Marvel writer-editor Roy Thomas recalled in 2007 that editor-in-chief Stan Lee "had the idea, and I think the names, for all three. He wanted to do some books that would have special appeal to girls. We were always looking for way to expand our franchise. My idea...was to try to get women to write them".

The series was written by writer Jean Thomas, who was at the time married to Roy Thomas, and by artist Winslow Mortimer. The stories, unlike most of Marvel's offerings at the time, contain no superheroes or fantastic elements. However, the night nurses encounter "danger, drama and death", as the cover tag proclaims, as they work to foil bomb plots, expose incompetent surgeons, and confront mob hitmen. Night Nurse #4, the final issue, took place away from Metro General and New York City, instead featuring Christine embroiled in a gothic adventure, complete with a foreboding mansion, dusty secret passageways, and mysterious lights.

In a 2010 interview, Jean Thomas offered her theory on the series' early cancellation: 

Linda Carter reappeared as a medical professional specializing in helping injured superheroes in Daredevil vol. 2, #58 (May 2004), written by Brian Michael Bendis and drawn by Alex Maleev. Matt Murdock / Daredevil refers to her then as "the night nurse ... [who is] sympathetic to ... costumed persons who get a little nicked up in ... the call of duty."

Night Nurse co-star Christine Palmer reappeared in Nightcrawler vol. 3, #1 (Sept. 2004). Series writer Roberto Aguirre-Sacasa explained he was "a huge fan" of Night Nurse, and brought back the character when he realized his first Nightcrawler story would take place in a hospital.

A one-shot issue, Night Nurse vol. 2, #1 (July 2015), reprinted the 1970s series' four issues, as well as Daredevil vol. 2, #80 (Feb. 2006).

Prior to Night Nurse, writer-editor Stan Lee and artist Al Hartley had created the series Linda Carter, Student Nurse for Atlas Comics, Marvel's 1950s precursor. It ran nine issues (Sept. 1961–Jan. 1963).

Characters
While the three roommates initially bicker amongst themselves, they soon bond over their shared loneliness, and become best friends. Originally, none of the three nurses then used "night nurse" as a label, though the "Next Issue" box in Night Nurse #1 promises, "More true-to-life adventures of Linda Carter, Night Nurse!"

Linda Carter

Linda Carter is the daughter of a doctor in Allentown, New York. After moving to New York City and moving in with roommates Christine Palmer and Georgia Jenkins, she meets and falls in love with Marshall Michaels, a wealthy businessman. When he forces her to choose between marrying him or staying at Metro General as a nurse, she chooses her career. In the following two issues of the series, Linda demonstrates that her skills are not limited to nursing practice, as she performs detective work to help expose an incompetent surgeon and prevents a hitman from murdering a patient. By the time the series was canceled, she had started a budding romance with Dr. Jack Tryon, a young resident doctor. Palmer is the protagonist of Night Nurse #4, with Carter making a one-panel cameo and Jenkins not appearing at all.

Carter reappears in Daredevil (vol. 2) #58 (May 2004), takes care of the seriously injured hero following his defeat by the Yakuza. Having been rescued by a superhero and wanting to pay the superhuman community back by ministering to heroes' health, often pro bono, she becomes a character that superheroes—including Luke Cage and Iron Fist—seek out for off the record medical care. During the superhero "Civil War" over government registration, the Night Nurse takes Captain America's side against the registration act, and joins his resistance group. Though she is difficult to recognize in Civil War #2 (August 2006), editor Tom Brevoort stated that it was Carter welcoming the superhero team the Young Avengers at the new headquarters. Carter teams with Doctor Strange in the five-issue miniseries Doctor Strange: The Oath (December 2006-April 2007), By the end, Carter and Strange enter into a relationship, which later ends.

Carter then treated the ninja assassin Elektra, who had been severely wounded by the shapeshifting alien Skrulls during the Skrull Invasion. After Elektra's subsequent imprisonment by the newly formed H.A.M.M.E.R., Carter and Elektra form a bond. Later, Jessica Drew / Spider-Woman, a longtime patient, visits Carter's practice, which by now has access to some Iron Man.

Georgia Jenkins

Georgia Jenkins is an African-American nurse who comes from an inner city neighborhood, blocks away from Metro General Hospital. On her days off from work, she provides free medical care to the people on her old block. She discovers that her older brother Ben was conned into nearly blowing up the hospital generator. Even though Ben has a change of heart and is shot while trying to protect the nurses, Georgia finds out in issue #3 that Ben has been sentenced to 10-to-20 years in prison. She angrily compares the harshness of his sentence to the fact that powerful mob criminals walk around freely.

Christine Palmer

Christine Palmer leaves her home in "an exclusive Midwestern suburb" against her father's wishes, intending to "make a new life without her father's money". In issue #2, her father comes to New York to try to convince her to return to her life as a debutante, threatening that "if you don't come home by Thanksgiving, then don't come home at all!" Though she considers his offer, she elects to stay in New York and becomes a surgical nurse for Dr. William Sutton. When Dr. Sutton's career ends in disaster, she leaves New York City and her friends behind, and travels the country, finding a job as a private nurse for a paraplegic at a spooky mansion. However, this particular position is short-lived. Palmer ends up returning to Metropolitan General Hospital, where she first encounters Storm and Nightcrawler of the X-Men. It is revealed in the Nightcrawler series that her mother lives in Tucson, Arizona.

In other media

Marvel Cinematic Universe

 Christine Palmer appears in media set in the Marvel Cinematic Universe (MCU), portrayed by Rachel McAdams. This version is a fellow surgeon, ex-girlfriend, and ally of Stephen Strange who appears in the live-action films Doctor Strange (2016) and Doctor Strange in the Multiverse of Madness (2022). Additionally, McAdams voices an alternate timeline version of Palmer in the Disney+ animated series What If...? episode "What If... Doctor Strange Lost His Heart Instead of His Hands?".
 Elements of Linda Carter and the Night Nurse series were hybridized with the comic book character Claire Temple, a medical doctor and love interest of Luke Cage, to create the MCU character of Nurse Claire Temple, portrayed by Rosario Dawson. First appearing in the Netflix series Daredevil, series showrunner Steven S. DeKnight noted that the character was originally "going to be the actual Night Nurse from the comics ... we had her name in a script and it came back that it was possible [Marvel Studios] was going to use her" in the Marvel Cinematic Universe and "had plans for her down the road", necessitating the change to the more obscure comics character Claire Temple. He later added "We just switched to another character that was very much kind of the same realm of Night Nurse". Temple also appears in Jessica Jones, Luke Cage,  Iron Fist, and The Defenders.

Video games

 Night Nurse appears as an unlockable character in the mobile game Marvel Strike Force. This version is armed with a gun that fires hypodermic needles.

References

External links
Night Nurse (both volumes) at The Unofficial Handbook of Marvel Comics Creators.
 Night Nurse at Comic Vine

1972 comics debuts
Comics characters introduced in 1972
Fictional American nurses
Marvel Comics female characters
Romance comics
Characters created by Stan Lee